Astrakhan Tatars are an ethnic subgroup of the Volga Tatar.

In the 15th to 17th-centuries, the Astrakhan Tatars inhabited the Astrakhan Khanate (1459–1556), which was also inhabited by the Nogai Horde, and the Astrakhan Tatars experienced a profound effect on Nogais. Since the 17th century, there has been an increased interaction and ethnic mixing of the Astrakhan Tatars with Kazan Tatars.

Population

The Astrakhan Tatars (around 60,000) are a group of Tatars, descendants of the Astrakhan Khanate's population, who live mostly in Astrakhan Oblast. For the Russian Census in 2010, most Astrakhan Tatars declared themselves simply as Tatars and few declared themselves as Astrakhan Tatars. A large number of Volga Tatars live in Astrakhan Oblast and differences between them have been disappearing.

According to the Encyclopædia Britannica Eleventh Edition, writing in 1911, "The Astrakhan Tatars (about 10,000) are, with the Mongol Kalmucks, all that now remains of the once so powerful Astrakhan empire. They also are agriculturists and gardeners..."

While Astrakhan (Ästerxan) Tatar is a mixed dialect, around 43,000 have assimilated to the Middle (i.e., Kazan) dialect. Their ancestors are Kipchaks, Khazars and some Volga Bulgars. (Volga Bulgars had trade colonies in modern Astrakhan and Volgograd oblasts of Russia.)

The Astrakhan Tatars also assimilated the Agrzhan.

Culture

20th century 
To 1917, the Astrakhan - one of the major centers of Tatar cultural and social life. Some Kazan Tatars settled in Astrakhan. In 1892, the functioning madrassas "lower classes." The newspaper "Azat Halyk" (1917-1919), "Irek" (1917), "Islah" (1907), "tartysh" (1917-1919), "Idel" (1907 - 1914, renewed in 1991). News magazines "Azat Khanum" (1917-1918), "Magarif" (1909), "Wheel" (1907), etc. Since 1907, he has worked Tatar folk theater. In 1919, organized by Astrakhan Tatar drama school.

Present 
At present, the company operates the Astrakhan region of the Tatar national culture "Duslyk" and Tatar youth center "Umid" (founded in 1989). Parallel works "Center of preservation and development of the Tatar culture" at the nonprofit Partnership Tatar business center (NP TDC)

Notable Astrakhan Tatars 

 Alex Battler – Russian-Canadian scholar and political writer.
 Rinat Dasayev – Russian football coach and a former Soviet goalkeeper.
 Renat Davletyarov - Russian film director, film producer and screenwriter.
 Marziyya Davudova – Russian-born Soviet Azerbaijani actress

Sources 

 DM Iskhakov Astrakhan Tatars, ethnic settlement and population dynamics in the XVIII - beginning of XX century. / / Astrakhan Tatars. - Kazan, 1992. - S. 5-33.
 The Tartars. The people of Russia. Encyclopedia. - M., 1994. - S. 320–321.

References 

 First site Astrakhan Tatars

Tatar people
Astrakhan Khanate
Volga Tatars